Hearst-Argyle Tower is the common name for the guyed tower used for TV broadcasting at Walnut Grove, California, United States at . The tower is owned by Hearst Stations Inc. 

The tower is 2000 ft or 609.6 m high and was finished in 1985. Close to it there are two masts of similar height, the KXTV/KOVR Tower and the Channel 40 Tower.

Current tenants

KCRA Virtual 3.1 Ch. 35 (digital)
KQCA Virtual 58.1 Ch. 23 (digital)

See also
 List of masts, Table of masts
 Tallest structures in the U.S.
 List of the world's tallest structures

References

External links
 
https://www.skyscraperpage.com/diagrams/?b7098
 
https://www.fybush.com/sites/2005/site-051111.html

Radio masts and towers in the United States
Towers in California
Buildings and structures in Sacramento County, California
Towers completed in 1985
1985 establishments in California